Roman Andreyevich Sludnov (born 24 February 1980) is a breaststroke swimmer from Russia. He was the first person to swim the long course 100 m breaststroke under one minute. In 2000 he held world records in the long course 100 m and short course 100 m and 200 m. At the 2000 Olympics, he won a bronze medal in the 100 m event.

Biography
Sludnov has a younger brother Artyom (born 1981) who won a national title in breaststroke in 1999. His parents, Natalia Roshchina and Andrei Sludnov, are elite swimming coaches and were taking both sons to their training sessions since early age. Sludnov learned to swim aged four, started training at seven, won his first title aged fourteen, and by 1997 was selected to the national team.

In the 2000s Sludnov's brothers were studying in the United States. Roman graduated from the University of Missouri in 2009 with a degree in finances and continues to study and train in Orlando, Florida.

Career

Sludnov was the first person to break the one minute barrier for the long course 100 m breaststroke, clocking a 59.97 at the Russian National Championships and World Championship Trials in Moscow on 29 June 2001. The day before, he beat the world record at 1:00.26. Less than a month later, Sludnov clocked 59.94 at the 2001 World Championships. He competed at the 2008 Summer Olympics, but could not match his bronze medal-winning performance from Sydney and finished in sixth place.

He swam for Russia at the:
Olympics: 2000, 2004, 2008, 2012
World Championships: 2001, 2007, 2011
European Championships: 2002, 2006, 2010
Short Course Worlds: 2000
Short Course Europeans: 1999, 2004

References

External links
Роман СЛУДНОВ: "КОНФЛИКТ С ФЕДЕРАЦИЕЙ СТОИЛ МНЕ НЕСКОЛЬКИХ ПОБЕД И РЕКОРДОВ". sport-express.ru. 31 July 2008

Russian male swimmers
Male breaststroke swimmers
Russian male breaststroke swimmers
Olympic swimmers of Russia
Swimmers at the 2000 Summer Olympics
Swimmers at the 2004 Summer Olympics
Swimmers at the 2008 Summer Olympics
Swimmers at the 2012 Summer Olympics
Olympic bronze medalists for Russia
1980 births
Living people
Sportspeople from Omsk
World record setters in swimming
Olympic bronze medalists in swimming
World Aquatics Championships medalists in swimming
Medalists at the FINA World Swimming Championships (25 m)
European Aquatics Championships medalists in swimming
Missouri State Bears swimmers
University of Missouri alumni
Medalists at the 2000 Summer Olympics